Thiffault is a surname of French origin. People with that name include:

 Charles Thiffault (born 1939), Canadian ice hockey coach
 Leo Thiffault (1944-2018), Canadian ice hockey player
 Oscar Thiffault (1912–1998), Canadian folk musician

See also
 

Surnames of French origin